The thousand-yard stare (also referred to as two-thousand-yard stare, combat shock, or shell shock) is a phrase often used to describe the blank, unfocused gaze of combatants who have become emotionally detached from the psychological trauma around them. It is sometimes used more generally to describe the look of dissociation among victims of other types of trauma.

The thousand-yard stare is likely the same phenomenon as what medical researchers refer to as the combat stress reaction.

Origin
The phrase was popularized after Life magazine published the painting Marines Call It That 2,000 Yard Stare by World War II artist and correspondent Tom Lea, although the painting was not referred to with that title in the 1945 magazine article. The painting, a 1944 portrait of a nameless Marine at the Battle of Peleliu, is now held by the United States Army Center of Military History in Fort Lesley J. McNair, Washington, D.C. About the real-life Marine who was his subject, Lea said:

When recounting his arrival in Vietnam in 1965, then-Corporal Joe Houle (director of the Marine Corps Museum of the Carolinas in 2002) said he saw no emotion in the eyes of his new squad: "The look in their eyes was like the life was sucked out of them," later learning that the term for their condition was "the 1,000-yard stare". "After I lost my first friend, I felt it was best to be detached," he explained.

See also
 Catatonia
 Combat stress reaction
 Defence mechanisms
 Hypervigilance
 James Blake Miller
 Post-traumatic stress disorder
 Shell shock

References

Aftermath of war
Military slang and jargon
Post-traumatic stress disorder
Thomas C. Lea III